Spirit of the Forest is the debut studio album by Finnish folk metal band Korpiklaani. It was released in 2003 through Napalm Records.

Track listing
All songs written by Jonne Järvelä, except where noted.

Personnel

Members 
 Jonne Järvelä - vocals, guitars, shaman drum
 Ali - percussion
 Hittavainen - violin, jouhikko, flute
 Honka - guitars
 Arto - bass

Guest musicians
 Tarnanen - accordion
 Jay Bjugg - guitars
 Samu "Dominator" Ruotsalainen - drums

Production
 Jameye - engineering
 Ozzie Rissanen - engineering
 Tarnanen - mixing, engineering
 Mika Jussila - mastering
 Jay Bjugg - producer, engineering, mixing
 Pekka Keskinen - cover art, booklet design

References

2003 debut albums
Korpiklaani albums
Napalm Records albums